Northcliff is a wealthy residential suburb of Johannesburg, South Africa. The suburb is located on Northcliff Ridge which provides views to both the north and the south. Northcliff's huge homes are nestled around a steep incline of the hill, and on the foot of Northcliff borders the suburbs of Fairland, Blackheath, Cresta and Berario. Recently some streets have been secured with boom gates. Although erroneously included by Google Maps as part of Randburg, Northcliff has never been part of Randburg. It is located in Region B of the City of Johannesburg Metropolitan Municipality.

History
The suburb is situated on part of an old Witwatersrand farm called Waterval. It was established on 3 October 1934 and named after the northerly ridge.

Geography

Topography

Northcliff Hill (also known as Aasvoëlkop (Vulture Ridge) due to the cliffs being predominantly inhabited by these birds of prey before being urbanised) is believed to have been populated by humans for over 250,000 years. At 1807 metres, the ridge is the second-highest point in Johannesburg, being one metre lower than Observatory Ridge. It has three vegetation zones and is inhabited by many different animals.

Economy

Retail
Northcliff is served by Cresta Shopping Centre, one of the largest malls in Johannesburg which is located on the border of Northcliff in the suburb of Cresta. Many other smaller suburban shopping complexes are within easy access, for example Northcliff Corner, The Verdi Centre, Heathway Square and Home Living Design Centre.

Education
While actually located in Blackheath, the suburb gives its name to Northcliff High School and Northcliff Primary School.

Infrastructure

Health systems
Marang House, a home for seriously ill children, is based in Northcliff.

Notable residents
 Leanne Manas, broadcast journalist, author
 Lira, singer, songwriter
 Fezile Mpela, actor, television producer
 Portia Gumede, actor, television producer
 Frans Marx, actor, writer, television producer, director
 Ruda Landman, broadcast journalist, co-anchor of famed investigation program Carte Blanche

References

Johannesburg Region B